Thurman Jennings (August 16, 1890 – January 23, 1978) was an American Negro league second baseman between 1914 and 1921.

Early life and career

A native of Ripley, Tennessee, Jennings made his Negro leagues debut in 1914 for the Chicago Giants. He went on to play six seasons for the club through 1921. Jennings died in Chicago, Illinois in 1978 at age 87.

References

Further reading
 'Mr. Fan' (May 26, 1917). "Wickware Knocked Off Mound". The Chicago Defender. p. 6
 Defender staff (Oct 12, 1918). "Baseball Shrapnel". The Chicago Defender. p. 9. "'Puss' Greene is perhaps the most prominent third baseman before the public today, while Jennings is an outfielder of rare skill." [emphasis added]  
 Journal Times staff (May 31, 1922). "Big Ed Miller Decorates Colored Giants; Hurls Great Game to Delight of Followers". The Racine Journal Times. p. 8
 Herald-Press staff (October 2, 1922). "Israelites Win by Circuit Hit". The St. Joseph Herald-Press. p. 4
 Tribune staff (July 16, 1923). "A. & F., 4; Chicago Giants, 3". p. 15

External links
 and Baseball-Reference Black Baseball stats and Seamheads

1890 births
1978 deaths
Chicago Giants players
Baseball second basemen
Baseball players from Tennessee
People from Ripley, Tennessee
20th-century African-American sportspeople